Sergey Konstantinovich Okrugin (born January 1, 1963, in Yaroslavl) is a Russian chess player who holds the FIDE title of International Master (2009).

Chess career
Okrugin is one of the strongest chess players in Yaroslavl. In 1992 he won Open Latvian Chess Championship in Riga. In 1999 Sergey Okrugin participated in Russian Chess Championship in Moscow. In 2010 he participated in tournament in honor of the Yaroslavl's millennium. In 2011 Sergey Okrugin won silver medal in Yaroslavl Oblast Championship.

Chess trainer
Okrugin is a chess trainer in Yaroslavl's children and youth sport school.

References

External links
 
 
 
 

1963 births
Living people
Russian chess players
Soviet chess players
People from Yaroslavl
Chess International Masters
Chess coaches